In Greek mythology, Thaumas was a sea god, son of Pontus and Gaia, and the full brother of Nereus, Phorcys, Ceto and Eurybia.

Etymology

Mythology
According to Hesiod, Thaumas' wife was the Oceanid Electra, by whom he fathered Iris, Arke, and the harpies.

The late 4th-early 5th century poet Nonnus gives Thaumas and Electra two children: Iris, and the river Hydaspes.

Harpies
The names and numbers of Thaumas' harpy daughters vary:
 Hesiod and Apollodorus name them Aello and Ocypete. Virgil, names Celaeno as one of the harpies.

 Hyginus', preface to Fabulae lists the harpies as Celaeno, Ocypete, and Podarce, as daughters of Thaumas and Electra, in the narrative the harpies are named Aellopous, Celaeno, and Ocypete, and are the daughters of Thaumas and Ozomene.

Separate figures with the same name
 Thaumas was also the name of a centaur, who fought against the Lapiths at the Centauromachy.

Footnotes

References

Sources

 Apollodorus, Apollodorus, The Library, with an English Translation by Sir James George Frazer, F.B.A., F.R.S. in 2 Volumes. Cambridge, Massachusetts, Harvard University Press; London, William Heinemann Ltd. 1921.  Online version at the Perseus Digital Library.
 Callimachus, Callimachus and Lycophron with an English translation by A. W. Mair ; Aratus, with an English translation by G. R. Mair, London: W. Heinemann, New York: G. P. Putnam 1921. Internet Archive
 Hesiod, Theogony, in The Homeric Hymns and Homerica with an English Translation by Hugh G. Evelyn-White, Cambridge, Massachusetts., Harvard University Press; London, William Heinemann Ltd. 1914. Online version at the Perseus Digital Library.
 Hyginus, Gaius Julius, Fabulae in Apollodorus' Library and Hyginus' Fabulae: Two Handbooks of Greek Mythology, Translated, with Introductions by R. Scott Smith and Stephen M. Trzaskoma, Hackett Publishing Company,  2007. .
 Nonnus, Dionysiaca; translated by Rouse, W H D, II Books XVI–XXXV. Loeb Classical Library No. 345, Cambridge, Massachusetts, Harvard University Press; London, William Heinemann Ltd. 1940. Internet Archive
 Plato, Theaetetus in Plato in Twelve Volumes, Vol. 12 translated by Harold N. Fowler. Cambridge, Massachusetts, Harvard University Press; London, William Heinemann Ltd. 1921.  Online version at the Perseus Digital Library
 Servius, Commentary on the Aeneid of Vergil, Georgius Thilo, Ed. 1881.
 Smith, William; Dictionary of Greek and Roman Biography and Mythology, London (1873). "Thaumas"
 Virgil, Aeneid, Theodore C. Williams. trans. Boston. Houghton Mifflin Co. 1910. Online version at the Perseus Digital Library

Centaurs
Children of Gaia
Greek sea gods